Samraŏng is a district located in Takéo province, in southern Cambodia. According to the 1998 census of Cambodia, it had a population of 101,455.

Administration
As of 2019, Samraŏng has 11 communes, 147 villages.

See also
Phnom Chisor, an Angkorian site located in Samraŏng District

References

Districts of Takéo province